MacNeal may refer to:
Burgess Macneal, American electrical and recording engineer
Elizabeth Macneal (born 1988), British writer
Harry L. MacNeal (1875–1950), United States Marine and recipient of the Medal of Honor
Maggie MacNeal (born 1950), Dutch singer
Noel MacNeal (born 1961), American puppeteer, writer and television director
Susan Elia MacNeal (born 1968), American writer
Catherine MacNeal, American actress who played Lisa Taylor on the show 100 Deeds for Eddie McDowd
Archibald MacNeal Willard (1836–1918), American painter
MSC Software, engineering-software company founded as MacNeal–Schwendler Corporation by Richard MacNeal and Robert Schwendler

See also
Clan MacNeil, Scottish clan
McNeil (disambiguation)
McNeill (disambiguation)
MacNeil
MacNeill
McNeal
MacNeille

Surnames
Clan MacNeil